The women's discus F37/38 event at the 2008 Summer Paralympics took place at the Beijing National Stadium at 09:55 on 14 September.
There was a single round of competition; after the first three throws, only the top eight had 3 further throws.
The competition was won by Mi Na, representing .

Britain's Rebecca Chin, initially placed second in the event, was deprived of the silver medal in a dispute over her classification, and her result deleted from the table.

Results

 
WR = World Record. PR = Paralympic Record. SB = Seasonal Best.

References

Athletics at the 2008 Summer Paralympics
2008 in women's athletics